Mill Creek is a stream in southwestern Madison County and the northwest corner of Wayne County in the U.S. state of Missouri. It is a tributary of Crane Pond Creek.

The community of Brunot lies just west of the stream junction.

Mill Creek received its name on account of a gristmill on its course.

See also
List of rivers of Missouri

References

Rivers of Madison County, Missouri
Rivers of Wayne County, Missouri
Rivers of Missouri